The Ohio Athletic Conference men's basketball tournament is the annual conference basketball championship tournament for the NCAA Division III Ohio Athletic Conference. The tournament has been held annually since 1960, one of the oldest in Division III. It is a single-elimination tournament and seeding is based on regular conference season records.

The winner, declared conference champion, receives the OAC's automatic bid to the NCAA Men's Division III Basketball Championship.

Results

Championship records

 Hiram and Ohio Wesleyan never qualified for the tournament finals as members of the OAC

References

NCAA Division III men's basketball conference tournaments
Tournament
Recurring sporting events established in 1949